Vagabond Loafers is a 1949 short subject directed by Edward Bernds starring American slapstick comedy team The Three Stooges (Moe Howard, Larry Fine and Shemp Howard). It is the 118th entry in the series released by Columbia Pictures starring the comedians, who appeared in 190 shorts at the studio between 1934 and 1959.

Plot
The Stooges are inept plumbers at Day and Nite Plumbers. Moe is busy reading "How to Be a Plumber" when the phone rings with a request to fix a leaky faucet at the home of the wealthy Norfleets (Emil Sitka and Symona Boniface). The leak happens to spring up while the Norfleets are throwing a dinner party to celebrate the acquisition of a $50,000 Van Brocklin painting.

Moe struggles with the pipes in the basement while Shemp manages to trap himself inside a maze of pipes in the bathroom. Larry is assigned to finding the water cutoff and proceeds to dig up most of the lawn in an attempt to turn off the water. Shemp later surmises that the pipes fail to work properly because they are "clogged up with wires". Shemp and Moe proceed to remove the electrical system from the pipes and connect a water pipe to the freshly available pipe. The cook (Dudley Dickerson), who is in the kitchen trying to prepare an extravagant meal for the Norfleets, watches in bewilderment as the stove and chandelier gush water.

As the Norfleet's house transforms into Niagara Falls, two party guests named Mr. and Mrs. Allen (Kenneth MacDonald and Christine McIntyre) who turned out to be art painting stealing bandits who manage to swipe the prized Van Brocklin painting. However, the Stooges manage to catch onto the Allens' scheme and retrieve the painting.

Cast

Credited

Production notes
Vagabond Loafers was filmed January 25–28, 1949; the film title parodies the romantic expression "vagabond lovers."

Vagabond Loafers is a remake of 1940's A Plumbing We Will Go, and would itself be remade in 1956 as Scheming Schemers. Shemp was teamed with comedian El Brendel for the non-Stooge film Pick a Peck of Plumbers (1944), which in itself was a remake of Sidney and Murray's Plumbing for Gold (1934).

Vagabond Loafers marked the final appearances of two prolific Stooge supporting actors: Symona Boniface and Dudley Dickerson. Dickerson reprises his role as the startled cook from A Plumbing We Will Go using a mixture of stock footage from that short and new material, something of a rarity in later patchwork Stooges shorts. However, their faces would be seen in several more Stooge films when footage featuring the actors was recycled for future productions.

This was the first Stooges short to start with a modified opening title card, which now had "Columbia Pictures Corporation Presents" at the top and a new logo for the Stooges (with one "o" on a different level from the other). This opening title card would remain in effect on all but the two 3-D films (Spooks! and Pardon My Backfire) the Stooges would make through the last short featuring footage of Shemp (Commotion on the Ocean) in 1956.

References

External links 
 
 
 Vagabond Loafers at threestooges.net

1949 films
1949 comedy films
The Three Stooges films
American black-and-white films
Films directed by Edward Bernds
The Three Stooges film remakes
Columbia Pictures short films
American slapstick comedy films
1940s English-language films
1940s American films